A total solar eclipse occurred on December 12, 1871. A solar eclipse occurs when the Moon passes between Earth and the Sun, thereby totally or partly obscuring the image of the Sun for a viewer on Earth. A total solar eclipse occurs when the Moon's apparent diameter is larger than the Sun's, blocking all direct sunlight, turning day into darkness. Totality occurs in a narrow path across Earth's surface, with the partial solar eclipse visible over a surrounding region thousands of kilometres wide.

Observations

Related eclipses

Saros 130

References

 NASA chart graphics
 Googlemap
 NASA Besselian elements
 Sketch of Solar Corona 1871 December 12
 

1871 12 12
1871 in science
1871 12 12
December 1871 events